George Berley (died ca. 1720) was a Hudson's Bay Company captain. He was in command of the HBC ship Albany with the James Knight expedition seeking the Northwest Passage in 1719.

Along with the ship Discovery, captained by David Vaughan, the expedition set off from England in 1719. They were shipwrecked near Marble Island and took refuge there in either 1719 or 1720. Everyone who came ashore there died. The remains of the settlement were not discovered until 1768 when Samuel Hearne, a HBC explorer located them on the island.

References

Explorers of Canada
Hudson's Bay Company people
Year of birth uncertain
Year of death uncertain
1720s deaths